Propefusus undulatus is a species of sea snail, a marine gastropod mollusk in the family Fasciolariidae, the spindle snails, the tulip snails and their allies.

Description

Distribution

References

 Vermeij G.J. & Snyder M.A. (2018). Proposed genus-level classification of large species of Fusininae (Gastropoda, Fasciolariidae). Basteria. 82(4-6): 57-82

External links
  Perry, G. (1811). Conchology, or the natural history of shells: containing a new arrangement of the genera and species, illustrated by coloured engravings executed from the natural specimens, and including the latest discoveries. 4 pp., 61 plates. London
 Reeve L.A. (1847-1848). Monograph of the genus Fusus. In: Conchologia Iconica, vol. 4, pls 1-21 and unpaginated text. L. Reeve & Co., London

undulatus
Gastropods described in 1847